The 2015 Western Athletic Conference baseball tournament will take place beginning on May 20 and ending on May 24.  The top six regular season finishers of the league's ten teams will meet in the double-elimination tournament to be held at Sloan Park, spring training home of the Chicago Cubs in Mesa, Arizona.  The winner will earn the Western Athletic Conference's automatic bid to the 2015 NCAA Division I baseball tournament.

Seeding and format
The top six finishers from the regular season were seeded based on conference winning percentage. Grand Canyon was ineligible for the tournament due to their transition from Division II.

Bracket
All games will be broadcast on the WAC Digital Network. Corey Costelloe will call the action Thursday. Michael Potter will call the action Friday through the championship. Erin Slack will act as the reporter for all games.

References

Tournament
Western Athletic Conference Baseball Tournament
Western Athletic Conference Baseball